The following television stations operate on virtual channel 58 in the United States:

 K25NK-D in Rochester, Minnesota
 KBFX-CD in Bakersfield, California
 KDTX-TV in Dallas, Texas
 KLCS in Los Angeles, California
 KQCA in Stockton, California
 KWBA-TV in Sierra Vista, Arizona
 W16DZ-D in Tyron, North Carolina
 W23EX-D in Sussex, New Jersey
 W27EC-D in Belvidere, New Jersey
 W29EV-D in Hackettstown, New Jersey
 W30EF-D in Jefferson, North Carolina
 W31DI-D in Spruce Pine, North Carolina
 WAWD in Fort Walton Beach, Florida
 WBKI in Salem, Indiana
 WBMA-LD in BIrmingham, Alabama
 WDES-CD in Miramar Beach, Florida
 WDJT-TV in Milwaukee, Wisconsin
 WDPX-TV in Vineyard Haven, Massachusetts
 WIAV-CD in Washington, D.C.
 WJOS-LD in Pomeroy, Ohio
 WNAB in Nashville, Tennessee
 WNJB in New Brunswick, New Jersey
 WPGA-TV in Perry, Georgia
 WUJA in Caguas, Puerto Rico
 WUNG-TV in Concord, North Carolina

References

58 virtual